Danway is an unincorporated community in Miller Township, LaSalle County, Illinois, United States.

History
A post office was established at Danway in 1872, and remained in operation until 1903. The community's name honors Daniel Way, a local pioneer.

References

Unincorporated communities in LaSalle County, Illinois
Unincorporated communities in Illinois
1872 establishments in Illinois